Ziziphus mauritiana, also known as Indian jujube, Indian plum, Chinese date, Chinee apple, ber,beri  and dunks is a tropical fruit tree species belonging to the family Rhamnaceae.  It is often confused with the closely related Chinese jujube (Z. jujuba), but whereas Z. jujuba prefers temperate climates, Z. mauritiana is tropical to subtropical.

Ziziphus mauritiana is a spiny, evergreen shrub or small tree up to 15 m high, with trunk 40 cm or more in diameter; spreading crown; stipular spines and many drooping branches. The fruit is of variable shape and size. It can be oval, obovate, oblong or round, and can be 1-2.5 in (2.5-6.25 cm) long, depending on the variety. The flesh is white and crisp. When slightly underipe, this fruit is a bit juicy and has a pleasant aroma. The fruit's skin is smooth, glossy, thin but tight.

The species is believed to have originated in Indo-Malaysian region of South-East Asia. It is now widely naturalised throughout the Old World tropics from Southern Africa through the Middle East to the Indian Subcontinent and China, Indomalaya, and into Australasia and the Pacific Islands. While the Rhamnaceae family are considered nitrogen fixing trees, Ziziphus mauritiana can form dense stands and become invasive in some areas, including Fiji and Australia, and has become a serious environmental weed in Northern Australia. It is a fast-growing tree with a medium lifespan, that can quickly reach up to 10–40 ft (3 to 12 m) tall.

Botany 

Ziziphus mauritiana is a medium-sized tree that grows vigorously and has a rapidly developing taproot, a necessary adaptation to drought conditions. The species varies widely in height, from a bushy shrub 1.5 to 2 m tall, to a tree 10 to 12 m tall with a trunk diameter of about 30 cm. Z. mauritiana may be erect or wide-spreading, with gracefully drooping thorny branches, zigzag branchlets, thornless or set with short, sharp straight or hooked spines.

The leaves are alternate, ovate or oblong elliptic with rounded apex, with 3 depressed longitudinal veins at the base. The leaves are about 2.5 to 3.2 cm long and 1.8 to 3.8 cm wide having fine tooth at margin. It is dark-green and glossy on the upper side and pubescent and pale-green to grey-green on the lower side. Depending on the climate, the foliage of the Z. mauritiana may be evergreen or deciduous.

The flowers are tiny, yellow, 5-petalled and are usually in twos and threes in the leaf axils. Flowers are white or greenish white and the fruits are orange to brown, 2–3 cm long, with edible white pulp surrounding a 2-locular pyrene.

This quick growing tree starts producing fruits within three years. The fruit is a soft, juicy, drupe that is 2.5 cm diameter, though in some cultivars the fruit size may reach up to 6.25 cm long and 4.5 cm wide. The form may be oval, obovate, round or oblong; the skin smooth or rough, glossy, thin but tough. The fruit ripen at different times even on a single tree. Fruits are first green, turning yellow  as they ripen. The fully mature fruit is entirely red, soft, juicy with wrinkled skin and has a pleasant aroma.  The ripe fruit is sweet and sour in taste. Both flesh texture and taste are reminiscent of apples. When under ripe the flesh is white and crispy, acid to subacid to sweet in taste.  Fully ripe fruits are less crisp and somewhat mealy; overripe fruits are wrinkled, the flesh buff-coloured, soft, spongy and musky. At first the aroma is apple like and pleasant but it becomes peculiarly musky when overripe. There is a single, hard, oval or oblate, rough central stone which contains 2 elliptic, brown seeds, 1/4 in (6mm) long.

Ecology 
Ziziphus mauritiana is a hardy tree that copes with extreme temperatures and thrives under rather dry conditions with an annual rainfall of 6 to 88.5 in (15–225 cm). In Fiji, sometimes naturalised Ber trees grow along roadsides and in agricultural land, usually near sea level but occasionally up to an elevation of about 600 m.  It also grows well on laterite, medium black soils with good drainage, or sandy, gravelly, alluvial soil of dry river-beds where it is vigorously spontaneous. In Australia, this species grows on a wide variety of soil types, including cracking clays, solodic soils and deep alluvials, in the tropics and sub-tropics where the average annual rainfall is in the range 470-1200mm. In the drier parts of this range, it grows best in riparian zones. Commercial cultivation usually extends up to 1000 m. Beyond this elevation trees do not perform well, and cultivation becomes less economical.

The tree has a high tolerance to both water-logging and drought and can grow where annual rainfall ranges from 125 to 2,225 mm, but is more widespread in areas with an annual rainfall of 300 to 500 mm. In China and India, wild trees are found up to an elevation of 5,400 ft (1,650 m). In India, the minimum shade temperature for survival is 7–13° and the maximum temperature is 50 °C. Studies report that this species flourishes in alkaline soils with a pH as high as 9.2. However, deep sandy loam to loamy soils with neutral or slightly alkaline pH are considered optimum for growth. In India, the tree grows best on sandy loam, neutral or slightly alkaline.

Reproductive biology 
Some cultivars attain anthesis early in the morning, others do so later in the day. The flowers are protandrous. Hence, fruit set depends on cross-pollination by insects attracted by the fragrance and nectar. Pollen of the Indian jujube is thick and heavy. It is not airborne but is transferred from flower to flower by honeybees. The flowers are pollinated by ants and other insects, and in the wild state the trees do not set fruits by self-pollination. Best propagates by seeds, seedlings, direct sowing, root suckers as well as by cuttings. Ber seeds  are spread by birds, native animals, stock, feral pigs and humans who eat the fruit and expel the seeds. Seeds may remain viable for 2½ years but the rate of germination declines with age. Cross-incompatibility occurs, and cultivars have to be matched for good fruit set; some cultivars produce good crops parthenocarpically.

Propagation 

Ziziphus mauritiana is one of the two Ziziphus species that have considerable horticulture importance, the other being Chinese jujube (Z. jujuba). Indian jujube (Z. mauritiana) is more tropical, whereas Chinese jujube is a more cold hardy species.

In India, there are 90 or more cultivars, varying in the habit of the tree; leaf shape; fruit form, size, color, flavor and keeping quality; and fruiting season. Among the important cultivars, eleven are described in the encyclopaedic Wealth of India: 'Banarasi (or Banarsi) Pewandi', 'Dandan', 'Kaithli' ('Patham'), 'Muria Mahrara', 'Narikelee', 'Nazuk', 'Sanauri 1', 'Sanauri 5', 'Thornless' and 'Umran' ('Umri'). The skin of most is smooth and greenish-yellow to yellow.

Propagation is most commonly from seed, where pretreatment is beneficial. Storage of the seed for 4 months to let it after-ripen improves germination. The hard stone restricts germination and cracking the shell or extraction of seeds hastens germination. Without pretreatment the seeds normally germinate within six weeks whereas extracted seeds only need one week to germinate.

Seedlings to be used as rootstock can be raised from seed. Several studies indicate that germination can be improved by soaking seeds in sulfuric acid. Germination time can also be shortened to 7 days by carefully cracking the endocarp. Ber seedlings do not tolerate transplanting, therefore the best alternatives are to sow the seeds directly in the field or to use polythene tubes placed in the nursery bed. Seedlings are ready for budding in 3 to 4 months. In addition, seedlings from the wild cultivars can be converted into improved cultivars by top-working and grafting. Nurseries are used for large scale seedling multiplication and graft production. The seedlings should also be given full light. The seedlings may need as long as 15 months in the nursery before planting in the field.

Scientists in India have standardised propagation techniques for Ber establishment. Budding is the easiest method of vegetative propagation used for improved cultivars. Different types of budding techniques have been utilised with ring-budding and shield-budding being the most successful. Wild varieties of ber are usually used as the root-stock. The most common being Z. rotundifolia in India and Z. spina-christi in Africa.

Season and harvesting 

Plants are capable of seed production once they reach a height of about 1 metre. Wild-growing plants in northern Australia may take 8 years to reach this size. In Australia, plants growing under natural conditions are capable of producing seeds once they reach a height of about 1m. Plants between 1 and 2m high produce, on average, less than five fruits per season. Large plants (>5m high) can produce 5000 or more fruits in a single season.

In India, some types ripen as early as October, others from mid-February to mid-March, others in March, or mid-March, to the end of April. In the Assiut Governorate, there are 2 crops a year, the main in early spring, the second in the fall. In India the trees flower in July to October and fruits are formed soon after. In February–March the fruits are mature and in some places a second crop is produced in the fall. Pickings are done by hand from ladders and about 110 lbs (50 kg)is harvested per day. The fruits remaining on the tree are shaken down. Only fully mature fruits are picked directly from the tree. They are transported in open bags to avoid fermentation.

Seedling trees bear 5,000 to 10,000 small fruits per year in India. Superior grafted trees may yield as many as 30,000 fruits. The best cultivar in India, with fruits normally averaging 30 to the lb (66 to the kg), yields 175 lbs (77 kg) annually. Special cultural treatment increases both fruit size and yield.

World production and yield 
The major production regions for Indian jujube are the arid and semi arid regions of  India. From 1984 to 1995 with improved cultivars the production was 0.9 million tonnes on a land of 88,000 ha. The crop is also grown in Pakistan, Bangladesh and parts of Africa. Trees in northern India yield 80 to 200 kg of fresh fruit/tree/year when the trees are in their prime bearing age of 10–20 years.

Uses 

The fruit is eaten raw, pickled or used in beverages. It is quite nutritious and rich in vitamin C. It is second only to guava and much higher than citrus or apples. In India, the ripe fruits are mostly consumed raw, but are sometimes stewed. Slightly underripe fruits are candied by a process of pricking, immersing in a salt solution. Ripe fruits are preserved by sun-drying and a powder is prepared for out-of-season purposes. It contains 20 to 30% sugar, up to 2.5% protein and 12.8% carbohydrates. Fruits are also eaten in other forms, such as dried, candied, pickled, as juice, or as ber butter. In Ethiopia, the fruits are used to stupefy fish.

The leaves are readily eaten by camels, cattle and goats and are considered nutritious.

In India and Queensland, the flowers are rated as a minor source of nectar for honeybees. The honey is light and of fair flavor.

Ber timber is hard, strong, fine-grained, fine-textured, tough, durable, and reddish in colour. It has been used to line wells, to make legs for bedsteads, boat ribs, agricultural implements, tool handles, and other lathe-turned items. The branches are used as framework in house construction and the wood makes good charcoal with a heat content of almost 4,900 kcal per kg. In addition, this species is used as firewood in many areas. In tropical Africa, the flexible branches are wrapped as retaining bands around conical thatched roofs of huts, and are twined together to form thorny corral walls to retain livestock.

The fruits are applied on cuts and ulcers; are employed in pulmonary ailments and fevers; and, mixed with salt and chili peppers, are given in indigestion and biliousness. The dried ripe fruit is a mild laxative. The seeds are sedative and are taken, sometimes with buttermilk, to halt nausea, vomiting, and abdominal pains in pregnancy. They check diarrhea, and are poulticed on wounds. Mixed with oil, they are rubbed on rheumatic areas. The leaves are applied as poultices and are helpful in liver troubles, asthma and fever and, together with catechu, are administered when an astringent is needed, as on wounds. The bitter, astringent bark decoction is taken to halt diarrhea and dysentery and relieve gingivitis. The bark paste is applied on sores. The root is purgative. A root decoction is given as a febrifuge, taenicide and emmenagogue, and the powdered root is dusted on wounds. Juice of the root bark is said to alleviate gout and rheumatism. Strong doses of the bark or root may be toxic. An infusion of the flowers serves as an eye lotion.

The fatty-acid methyl ester of Z. mauritiana seed oil meets all of the major biodiesel requirements in the USA (ASTM D 6751-02, ASTM PS 121-99), Germany (DIN V 51606) and European Union (EN 14214).  The average oil yield is 4.95 kg oil/tree or 1371 kg oil/hectare, and arid or semi-arid regions may be utilised due to its drought resistance.

Pests and diseases 

The greatest enemies of the jujube are fruit flies. Some cultivars are much more susceptible than others, the flies preferring the largest, sweetest fruits. 100% of those may be attacked, while on a neighbouring tree bearing a smaller, less-sweet type, only 2% of the crop may be damaged. The larvae pupate in the soil and it has been found that treatment of the ground beneath the tree helps reduce the problem. Control is possible with regular and effective spraying of insecticide.

A leaf-eating caterpillar  and the green slug caterpillar attack the foliage. Mites form scale-like galls on twigs, retarding growth and reducing the fruit crop. Lesser pests include a small caterpillar, Meridarches scyrodes, that bores into the fruit.

The tree is subject to shrouding by a parasitic vine . Powdery mildew causes defoliation and fruit-drop, but it can be adequately controlled. Lesser diseases are sooty mould, brown rot and leaf-spot. Leafspot results from infestation by Cercospora spp. and Isariopsis indica var. zizyphi. In 1973, a witches'-broom disease caused by a mycoplasma-like organism was found in jujube plants near Poona University. It proved to be transmitted by grafting or budding diseased scions onto healthy Z. mauritiana seedlings. Leaf rust, caused by Phakopsora zizyphivulgaris, ranges from mild to severe on all commercial cultivars in the Punjab.

In storage, the fruits may be spotted by fungi. Fruit rots are caused by Fusarium spp., Nigrospora oryzae, Epicoccum nigrum, and Glomerella cingulata.

References

External links
Profile Ziziphus mauritiana Lam. Indian jujube at United States Department of Agriculture

Ziziphus mauritiana - Forestry Nepal

mauritiana
Flora of Indo-China
Indomalayan realm flora
Flora of Nepal
Flora of India (region)
Flora of China
Fruits originating in Asia
Desert fruits
Crops originating from India
Crops originating from Pakistan
Drought-tolerant trees
Drought-tolerant plants
Flora naturalised in Australia
Taxa named by Jean-Baptiste Lamarck